George Hackathorne (February 13, 1896 – June 25, 1940) was an American actor of the silent era. He appeared in more than 50 films between 1916 and 1939. 

Hackathorne was born and educated in Pendleton, Oregon. Despite his mother's wishes that he get a college education, he chose to be an actor. He began his career as a child actor in stock theater, after which he performed in vaudeville. He and his brother had a dramatic act that toured the United States.

On June 25, 1940, Hackathorne died in Hollywood, California, at age 44. He was buried in Hollywood Forever Cemetery.

Partial filmography

 Oliver Twist (1916)
 Tom Sawyer (1917) - Sid Sawyer
 Huck and Tom (1918) - Sid Sawyer
 Amarilly of Clothes-Line Alley (1918) - Amarilly's Brother (uncredited)
 A Law Unto Herself (1918) - Bertrand Von Klassner at age 20
 The Heart of Humanity (1918) - Louis Patricia
 Sue of the South (1919) - Shad Peters
 Josselyn's Wife (1919) - Joe Latimer
 The Shepherd of the Hills (1919) - Ollie Stuart
 Better Times (1919) - Tony
 The Splendid Sin (1919) - The Honorable George Granville
 The Speed Maniac (1919) - Tom Matthews
 Too Much Johnson (1919) - Henry McIntosh
 The Last of the Mohicans (1920) - Captain Randolph
 To Please One Woman (1920) - Freddy
 The Sin of Martha Queed (1921) - Atlas
 High Heels (1921) - Laurie Trevor
 What Do Men Want? (1921) - Arthur
 The Light in the Clearing (1921) - Amos Grimshaw
 The Little Minister (1921) - Gavin
 The Gray Dawn (1922) - Calhoun Bennett
 The Worldly Madonna (1922) - Ramez
 Human Hearts (1922) - Jimmy Logan
 Notoriety (1922) - Batty
 The Village Blacksmith (1922) - Johnnie Hammond
 Human Wreckage (1923) - Jimmy Brown
 Merry-Go-Round (1923) - Bartholomew Gruber
Judgment of the Storm (1924) - Bob Heath
 When a Man's a Man (1924) - Yapavai Joe
 Surging Seas (1924) - Charles Stafford
 The Turmoil (1924) - Bibbs Sheridan
 Capital Punishment (1924) - Dan OConnor
 The Lady (1925) - Leonard Cairns
 Night Life of New York (1925) - Jimmy
 Wandering Fires (1925) - Raymond Corroll
 His Master's Voice (1925) - Bob Henley
 The Highbinders (1926) - Humpty Dugan
 Things Wives Tell (1926) - Charles
 The Truth About Men (1926) - James
 The Sea Urchin (1926) - Jack Trebarrow
 Cheaters (1927) - Paul Potter
 Paying the Price (1927) - Basil Payson
 Sally's Shoulders (1928) - Beau
 The Tip Off (1929) - 'Shrimp' Riley
 The Squall (1929) - Niki
 Captain of the Guard (1930) - Robespierre
 Hide-Out (1930) - Atlas
 The Lonesome Trail (1930) - Oswald
 Beyond the Law (1930) - Monty
 Riders of the North (1931) - Henchman Canuck Joe
 Self Defense (1932) - Paul
 Flaming Guns (1932) - Hugh - Ramsey's Secretary
 Only Yesterday (1933) - (uncredited)
 The Countess of Monte Cristo (1934) - Headwaiter (uncredited)
 Strange Wives (1934) - Guggin's Secretary
 Magnificent Obsession (1935) - Ex-Patient (uncredited)
 I Cover Chinatown (1936) - Head Waiter
 The Man I Married (1936) - Critic (uncredited)
 Smashing the Rackets (1938) - Detective (uncredited)
 Gone with the Wind (1939) - wounded soldier in pain (uncredited)

References

External links

 
 George Hackathorne at Virtual History

1896 births
1940 deaths
American male film actors
American male silent film actors
Burials at Hollywood Forever Cemetery
Male actors from Oregon
People from Pendleton, Oregon
20th-century American male actors
Vaudeville performers